is a Japanese football player. She plays for INAC Kobe Leonessa in the WE League and for the Japan national team.

Club career
Haza was born in Nishinomiya on March 16, 1996. After graduating from Nippon Sport Science University, she joined her local club INAC Kobe Leonessa in 2018. In August 2019, she moved to Spanish club SE AEM.

National team career
On September 13, 2014, when Haza was 18 years old, she debuted for Japan national team against Ghana. She was a member of Japan for 2014 Asian Games. She played three games and Japan won second place. She played four games for Japan in 2014. In November 2016, she was selected for Japan U-20 national team for the 2016 U-20 World Cup and Japan won third place.

National team statistics

References

External links

INAC Kobe Leonessa

1996 births
Living people
Association football people from Hyōgo Prefecture
Japanese women's footballers
Women's association football defenders
Nippon Sport Science University alumni
INAC Kobe Leonessa players
SE AEM players
Nadeshiko League players
Segunda Federación (women) players
Japan women's international footballers
Footballers at the 2014 Asian Games
Medalists at the 2014 Asian Games
Asian Games medalists in football
Asian Games silver medalists for Japan
Japanese expatriate women's footballers
Japanese expatriate sportspeople in Spain
Expatriate women's footballers in Spain